SARIO, Slovak Investment and Trade Development Agency (Slovenská agentúra pre rozvoj investícií a obchodu in Slovak) is a government agency established in the Slovak Republic in 2001, which works under the direction of the Ministry of Economy of the Slovak Republic.

SARIO operates internationally and domestically; its officials are regularly invited to attend professional forums to present and discuss issues of foreign direct investments and foreign trade. SARIO has a network of six regional offices in Slovakia and operates worldwide via 46 Commercial representatives of the Slovak Ministry of Economy. Currently, SARIO employs approximately 100 people.

Vision 
SARIO works actively to make the Slovak Republic a country with a well developed economy and an educated population with a high quality of life. In order to achieve these goals, SARIO utilizes valuable contacts both in Slovakia and abroad.

Mission 
The mission of SARIO is to improve the standard of living of Slovak citizens by promoting economic growth, increasing the employment rate and reducing regional disparities.

It achieves these objectives in a variety of ways:

•	Presenting the business environment in Slovakia to target groups abroad to increase awareness of the name "Slovakia" and create interest in foreign direct investments and trade.

•	Maximizing the inflow of foreign direct investments to Slovakia via active, targeted (e.g. by sector) international marketing and by increasing knowledge of the investment climate in Slovakia and by supporting creation of industrial parks.

•	Supporting foreign trade via matching bids and offers generated by the Commercial representatives network and other sources, and via subcontracting activities.

Address: Mlynské nivy 44/B, 821 09  Bratislava

Foreign Direct Investment Department 

In part due to SARIO's efforts, the amount of foreign direct investments is increasing at an expanding rate. In 2008, the agency completed a total of 34 investment projects amounting to 538 million EUR, which resulted in the creation of 4624 to 4979 new jobs.

The FDI section provides comprehensive investment services and up-to-date information for potential foreign investors on the business environment through:

•	Consultancy regarding legislation and tax, customs and  business conditions

•	Consultancy on setting up a new business

•	Consultancy in the area of state aid and processing of state aid applications

•	Consultancy regarding the contribution for new jobs created

•	Selection and offer of new real estate and brownfields

•	Setting up and coordination of meetings with representatives of the state administration and self-government bodies

•	Regional analyses

•	Sector analyses

•	Studies of the investment environment

•	Searching for appropriate suppliers

•	Assistance in the creation of joint ventures between Slovak and foreign companies

The FDI section also offers a whole range of services for established investors through its Aftercare department. The following are the most frequently requested:

•	Support regarding expansions, reinvestments and development of research operations

•	Assistance in finding adequate industrial zones and real estate

•	Consultancy regarding the drawing of state aid and joint financing of projects from structural funds of the EU
 
•	Searching for suppliers in the region
 
•	Support in the area of human resources
 
•	Development of investor cooperation with high schools, universities and vocational schools

•	Setting up and coordination of meetings with representatives of the state administration, self-government bodies and public institutions
 
•	Organization of expert seminars, business meetings with representatives of the state administration and social events

•	Assistance regarding the  applications for work permits, visas and permanent residence for foreign citizens
 
•	Submitting of legislation change proposals from investors to the Slovak Government and development of the Slovak investment environment

Foreign Trade Department 

The foreign trade section conducts activities to support export and develop foreign trade. Some of the top priorities are participation in general and specialized expositions and trade fairs, setting up trade delegations to other countries, receiving foreign delegations, designing educational programs for startup exporters, provision of consulting services at home and abroad, and developing marketing studies.

Key activities:

•	Expositions and trade fairs – Participation in expositions and trade fairs allows the promotion of Slovakia and Slovak entrepreneurs and agencies to take advantage of opportunities to strengthen trade and investment connections and develop new marketing relationships

•	Organizing trade missions - Official trips abroad for business groups that include specific goals and programs are among the most effective tools for striking up foreign trade relationships. These missions are organized with the intention of supporting the exporting activities of Slovak enterprises and are closely tied to introducing Slovak products to foreign markets. The impetus for organizing the missions comes primarily from the initiative taken by Slovak enterprises and these missions also follow the economic policies of the Slovak government.

•	SARIO Information Center – In order to effectively conduct foreign trade activities as a trade promotion agency, the SARIO Information Center (SIC) project is used to maintain efficient communication between foreign countries and the business entities in Slovakia.	
	
•	Subcontracting - Promoting international cooperation means supporting the creation of conditions necessary to work with foreign customers - by promoting small and medium Slovak enterprises at foreign subcontractors' trade fairs, increasing visibility on the internet, creating trade delegations with potential foreign partners to Slovakia, arranging personal meetings between the parties involved	and cooperating with the subcontracting centers of Europe. The primary objective is to create an awareness of the production capabilities and promote a close working relationship between Slovak producers and foreign investors.

External links
Official site of SARIO

Economy of Slovakia
Investment promotion agencies